Jean Prunescu (born 6 July 1989) is a Romanian football player who plays as a defender. In the 2008–09 season, Prunescu played three games in Liga I while on loan to Gloria Buzău.

Notes 
 2007–2008 and 2008–2009 Liga III appearances and goals made for Steaua II București are unavailable.

References

External links
 
 

1989 births
Living people
Romanian footballers
Association football defenders
Liga I players
Liga II players
FC Steaua București players
FC Steaua II București players
FC Gloria Buzău players
FC Petrolul Ploiești players
AFC Dacia Unirea Brăila players
CS Minaur Baia Mare (football) players